Richard Frost was a U.S. Representative from Missouri.

Richard Frost may also refer to:

 Richard Frost (poet) in The Best American Poetry 1995
 Richard Frost (horse racing) in 1990 Cheltenham Gold Cup
Richard Frost (oceanographer), namesake of Frost Rocks